2016 Thai Football Division 3 Tournament Eastern Region  is the 1st season of the League competition since its establishment in 2016. It is in the fourth tier of the Thai football league system.

Venue Stadium and locations (2016) 
All matches played in Chonburi

Member clubs

Format 
Group stage: A total 21 clubs will be divided into four groups of three clubs except group 7 which has four clubs to play round-robin matches at a neutral venue. The best clubs of group A and G qualify to Quarter-finals round of the knock-out stage. The best two clubs of group B, C, D, E, F and runner-up of group A and G will qualify to Second round of the knock-out stage.

Knock-out stage: A total of 14 clubs which has qualified from the group stage will play single-elimination stage until there are only two finalists of the tournament.

Result

First round

Group A

Group B

Group C

Group D

Group E

Group F

Group G

Second round

Quarter-finals Round

Semi-finals Round

Final round

Winner

See also 
2016 Thai Division 3 Tournament Northern Region
2016 Thai Division 3 Tournament North Eastern Region
2016 Thai Division 3 Tournament Central Region
2016 Thai Division 3 Tournament Southern Region

References

External links
 http://www.thailandsusu.com/webboard/index.php?topic=375896.0
 https://web.archive.org/web/20160922134240/http://fathailand.org/archives/9792
 https://web.archive.org/web/20161202170443/http://fathailand.org/archives/14330
 https://web.archive.org/web/20161230231745/http://fathailand.org/archives/15748
 http://www.thailandsusu.com/webboard/index.php?topic=378874.0
 ฟุตบอลดิวิชัน 3 ฤดูกาล 2559

East
2016 in Thai football leagues